Čerević is a village in Serbia. It is situated in the Beočin municipality, in the Vojvodina province. Although, the village is geographically located in Syrmia, it is part of the South Bačka District. The village has a Serb ethnic majority and its population numbers 2,798 people (2011 census).

Name

In Serbian the village is known as Čerević (Черевић), in Croatian as Čerević, and in Hungarian as Cserög.

History

During the Axis occupation in World War II, 87 civilians were killed in Čerević by fascists.

Historical population

1961: 2,096
1971: 2,144
1981: 2,527
1991: 2,510
2011: 2,798

References

Miloš Lukić, Putevima slobode - naselja opštine Beočin u ratu i revoluciji, Novi Sad, 1987.
Slobodan Ćurčić, Broj stanovnika Vojvodine, Novi Sad, 1996.

See also
List of places in Serbia
List of cities, towns and villages in Vojvodina

Populated places in Syrmia
South Bačka District
Beočin